The Story of Light "Real Illusions: ...of a..." is the eighth studio album by guitarist Steve Vai, released on August 14, 2012 through Favored Nations Entertainment. It is Vai's first full-length studio album since 2005's Real Illusions: Reflections. On May 23, 2012 The Story of Light was made available for pre-order through Vai's official website with an instant download of "Gravity Storm". The track "John the Revelator" contains a sample of Blind Willie Johnson's song of the same name. "The Moon and I" was initially released as a VaiTunes digital only single in 2010. However, due to the personal nature of the song, Vai decided to remix it and include it on the album.
The album debuted on Billboard 200 at No. 78.

Concept
The Story of Light is the second installment of the Real Illusions trilogy, a "multi-layered melange based on the amplified mental exaggerations of a truth-seeking madman who sees the world through his own distorted perceptions", according to the booklet introduction. In an interview with ClassicRock Revisisted, Vai explained: 

According to Vai, "Captain Drake Mason... at one point writes a book. He presents his book, which is titled Under It All, to the town. The first chapter is called "The Story of Light". On the record, the lyrics are printed in English, but I didn't want to present them that way because it is too obvious. I wanted to do them in another language to add mystique. I went through all of these languages in my head trying to find the right one. Every language has a dynamic to it. Italian sounds like music, and French is effeminate, so it sounds beautiful, in a way. German has a lot of rough edges and comes off very masculine. All of those had too much of a tilt. Russian is such a beautiful language because it has just the right amount of rough edges and just the right amount of romance. Still, there is an authority to it. That is why I decided to do it in Russian."

Track listing

Personnel
Steve Vai – guitar (all tracks) and vocals (tracks 8, 11), keyboards
Philip Bynoe – bass
Jeremy Colson – drums
Mike Mangini - drums on "The Moon And I"
Deborah Henson-Conant – harp (track 7)
Beverly McClellan – vocals (track 3 and 4)
Aimee Mann – vocals (track 11)
Bernie Grundman – mastering
Dave Rosenthal – piano (track 1) 
Julia Rainy May Vai – Russian narration (track 1)
Bob Carpenter – Hammond B3 (tracks 3, 4, 12)
Mike Keneally – keyboards (track 8)
Dave Weiner – rhythm guitar (track 8)

References

Steve Vai albums
2012 albums
Hard rock albums by American artists
Instrumental rock albums
Progressive rock albums by American artists
Favored Nations albums